Fernando Hernández (born June 16, 1971) is a Dominican former professional baseball pitcher. He played in Major League Baseball (MLB) for the Detroit Tigers.

His son, Jonathan Hernández, is also a professional baseball player.

References

External links

1971 births
Living people
Burlington Indians players (1986–2006)
Detroit Tigers players
Canton-Akron Indians players
Columbus Red Stixx players
Dominican Republic expatriate baseball players in South Korea
Dominican Republic expatriate baseball players in the United States
Gulf Coast Indians players
KBO League pitchers
Kinston Indians players
Las Vegas Stars (baseball) players
Lotte Giants players
Major League Baseball pitchers
Major League Baseball players from the Dominican Republic
Memphis Chicks players
New Orleans Zephyrs players
People from Santiago de los Caballeros
Rancho Cucamonga Quakes players
Rieleros de Aguascalientes players
Round Rock Express players
SSG Landers players
Sultanes de Monterrey players
Toledo Mud Hens players
Tucson Sidewinders players
Wichita Wranglers players
Dominican Republic expatriate baseball players in Mexico
Dominican Republic expatriate baseball players in Taiwan
Macoto Cobras players